Senator Haynes may refer to:

Joe M. Haynes (1936–2018), Tennessee State Senate
Landon Carter Haynes (1816–1875), Confederate States Senator from Tennessee from 1862 to 1865
Ray Haynes (born 1954), California State Senate
Elizabeth Pugsley Hayward (1854–1942), Utah State Senate
Elizabeth Steiner Hayward, Oregon State Senate
Monroe Hayward (1840–1899), U.S. Senator from Nebraska in 1899
William C. Hayward (1847–1917), Iowa State Senate

See also
Senator Hayne (disambiguation)